The europa was a token coinage created in 1928 by , a politician and industrialist from the Nièvre region in France. The coins were minted in the name of a hypothetical "Federated States of Europe" (États fédérés d'Europe). Unlike contemporary currencies based on the gold standard, the europa was intended to derive its notional value from its value in labour.

The currency never circulated except unofficially between federalists of the Nièvre region. Two denominations were produced, both depicting Louis Pasteur and a map of Europe on the obverse and reverse respectively: one valued at 1 europa and another at 1/10 of a europa.

Further reading

External links

Joseph Archer imaginait l'Europe avant tout le monde in Le Journal de Saône-et-Loire

History of the European Union
Currencies of Europe
1928 in France
Currencies introduced in 1928
Proposed currencies